Following is a list of lakes in Wyoming.
Information listed is taken from the infobox in the associated article unless otherwise specified.

See also

List of dams and reservoirs in Wyoming
List of rivers in Wyoming

References

Wyoming
Lakes